Tulsi Prasad Joshi (Tulasi Diwasa) is a Nepalese literary figure and folklore expert. He is a prominent name in modern Nepali poetry. He was honoured with the title Bisista Sahitya Siromani at the International Poetry Festival in India in April 2013.

Professor Diwasa had served as Cultural Secretary at the Nepalese Embassy in the US and had also taught as a visiting professor at various universities abroad. He is now a life member of Nepal Academy and the President of Nepali Folklore Society (NFS).

Diwasa has served as professor of Nepali Literature in Trichandra College and Padmakanya Campus at Kathmandu for several years.

He has authored dozen of books on literature and folk culture and folklore of various tribes in Nepal.

Works 

 Tulasi Diwasa Ka Kabita (1984)
 Nepali Lok Katha

References

1941 births
Living people
20th-century Nepalese poets
Nepali-language poets
Tribhuvan University alumni
Nepalese scholars
People from Dhankuta District
Nepalese male poets
20th-century male writers
Nepalese folklorists